Florence Alice Lubega (5 November 1917 – 28 October 2021) was a Ugandan politician and the first female Ugandan to join Parliament in the independent Uganda in May 1962. She was one of the first female legislators of Uganda, being a member of the Legislative Council (LEGCO). She was also a member of the first Ugandan Parliament, and Deputy Minister for Community Development and Labour.

Background and education 
Florence Lubega was the daughter of Buganda Premier Samuel Wamala and Erina Nantongo.

She was educated at Gayaza Girls' School before joining Buloba Teachers' College. Later she was the first female to be admitted to Makerere College School before joining Oxford University. Upon completion of her university studies in 1946, she returned to teach English at Makerere University.

Personal life 
Florence Lubega was married to Saulo Lubega, a teacher at Mityana secondary school and a former minister of finance Buganda government  Florence Lubega outlived her children and she had four  brothers; the late Israel Magembe Wamala [the musician]of Nakasajja in Kyaggwe, Wamala Steven Ssempasa, who lives in the United Kingdom, Paul Musoke Wamala, a former tourism operator who now lives in Luzira, a Kampala suburb and the late Wamala Herbert Dagirira.

She died on 28 October 2021, a week shy of her 104th birthday.

References

External links
 Uganda's first woman MP clocks 100
 Will new women leaders carry on the legacy?

1917 births
2021 deaths
Members of the Parliament of Uganda
20th-century Ugandan women politicians
20th-century Ugandan politicians
Women members of the Parliament of Uganda
Ugandan centenarians
Women centenarians